Michel Nack Balokog (born September 10, 1986) is a Cameroonian football midfielder whose last known club was Ravan Baku in the Azerbaijan Premier League.

Career
Balokog started his professional career with Coton Sport in his native Cameroon, where he won the national championship twice and the national cup twice.

During the 2011–12 winter transfer window, Balokog joined Slovenian 1. SNL team Domžale.

In August 2013 Balokog signed for Azerbaijan Premier League side Ravan Baku. Balokog made his debut for Ravan Baku in their second game of the 2013–14 season, a 0–2 home defeat against Neftchi Baku.

Career statistics

Honours

Player
Coton Sport
 Elite One (2) - 2009/10, 2010/11
 Cameroonian Cup (2) - 2008, 2011

References

External links
 
 

1986 births
Living people
Expatriate footballers in Azerbaijan
Cameroonian footballers
Cameroonian expatriate footballers
Ravan Baku FC players
Association football midfielders
Cameroonian expatriate sportspeople in Azerbaijan